Puerto Rico Highway 908 (PR-908) is a main highway in the city of Humacao, Puerto Rico. It begins in PR-3 as a two-lane per direction road, which ends being that way approaching University of Puerto Rico at Humacao. It intersects PR-30 just before approaching the institution. After that it becomes a rural one-lane per direction road. It goes back to PR-3, where it ends, near Yabucoa, Puerto Rico.

Major intersections

See also

 List of highways numbered 908

References

External links
 

908